Paranaense Fútbol Club is a Paraguayan football (soccer) club from Ciudad del Este; founded in the day the February 6, 2012.

History
The club was founded the February 6, 2012, after Liga Deportiva Paranaense won the Campeonato Nacional Interligas.

References

Paranaense
Paranaense
2012 establishments in Paraguay